Peter Robert Eastoe (born 2 August 1953) is an English former footballer.

Career
Eastoe signed schoolboy forms with Wolverhampton Wanderers in the late 1960s. Unable to break into the Wolves first team, the former English youth international joined Swindon Town in March 1974 for a club record fee of £88,000 – after a successful loan spell which saw him average a goal every other game, including a brace on his debut.

Though Eastoe's goals were not enough to maintain their Division Two status, in Division Three he notched 31 goals as Swindon challenged for promotion, elevating Eastoe to hero status at the County Ground. The club ultimately fell short of promotion but Eastoe's goals had alerted the attention of the bigger clubs.

The striker was signed by Queens Park Rangers in March 1976 for £100,000 (with Don Rogers returning to Swindon as part of the deal). He did not play in the remainder of that season, which saw QPR go close to winning the league championship, but found himself in the team over the next three seasons.

He was transferred to Everton in March 1979 – shortly before Rangers dropped out of Division One – in a straight swap for Mickey Walsh. After three full seasons at Goodison Park, he joined West Bromwich Albion in August 1982, where he had a full season in 1982-83.

Following this campaign, he was out of the club's plans and spent periods on loan at Leicester City, Huddersfield Town, Walsall and Wolverhampton Wanderers, respectively. During the twilight of his career he played in the Portuguese league at Farense and Louletano, and returned to England with non-league Atherstone United.

His managerial career included a spell with Nuneaton Borough, before he was appointed player-manager of Alvechurch in 1991. He now works as a lorry driver and lives with his family in Stourbridge.

Statistics

References 
 

1953 births
Living people
Sportspeople from Tamworth, Staffordshire
English footballers
Association football forwards
Wolverhampton Wanderers F.C. players
Swindon Town F.C. players
Queens Park Rangers F.C. players
Everton F.C. players
West Bromwich Albion F.C. players
Leicester City F.C. players
Huddersfield Town A.F.C. players
Walsall F.C. players
S.C. Farense players
Louletano D.C. players
Atherstone Town F.C. players
English Football League players
Primeira Liga players
English expatriate footballers
Expatriate footballers in Portugal
English expatriate sportspeople in Portugal
Nuneaton Borough F.C. managers
Alvechurch F.C. players
Alvechurch F.C. managers
English football managers